Meat Love is a 1989 Czechoslovak animated short film directed and animated by Jan Švankmajer. It appears as a commercial in Švankmajer's feature-length film Little Otik. It has also been shown on MTV.

Plot
A knife chops two slices off a chunk of fresh meat. The first slice, using a nearby spoon as a hand mirror, admires itself. Similar admiration is expressed by the second slice, which slaps the first slice on its 'rear', causing it to cry out and retreat coyly behind a tea-towel. The second slice switches on the radio, and persuades its companion to dance 'cheek to cheek' to the sound of an old 1920s recording. One slice jumps into a plate of flour and teasingly 'splashes' the other. Soon, the two slices are writhing ecstatically in the flour. Their passion is short-lived, however, as almost immediately afterwards they are skewered and fried.

External links
meatlove (film) from web.archive.org

1989 films
1980s animated short films
Films directed by Jan Švankmajer
1989 short films
Surrealist films
Czechoslovak animated short films
Czech animated short films